Smeaton may refer to:

 Smeaton, East Lothian, a village and estate in Scotland 
 Smeaton House, East Lothian, a historic site
 Smeaton, Saskatchewan, a Canadian community
 Smeaton, Victoria, an Australian town
 Smeaton (surname), people with the surname

See also
 Great Smeaton and the neighbouring Little Smeaton, Hambleton in North Yorkshire
 Kirk Smeaton and the neighbouring Little Smeaton, Selby, in Selby district, North Yorkshire